Shaun Byrne (born 21 January 1981) is a professional footballer who played as a defender or a midfielder. Born in England, he represented the Republic of Ireland internationally at youth level.

Club career
Byrne started as a trainee with West Ham before moving to Dublin City in 2004. After only four games with Dublin City he quit the team, citing the difficult transition from London to Dublin as the reason. Once free from multiple transfer binds, he trialed at various teams and then moved to Chesham United, initially on trial before joining permanently. He later played for Burnham and before transferring to Hemel Hempstead in March 2006 and Slough Town on 7 March 2009.

International career
Byrne captained the Republic of Ireland U16 side to victory at the UEFA European Championships in Scotland in May 1998. He was also part of the Republic's U21 side.

References

External links

Honours
UEFA U-17 Championship: 1998

Living people
1981 births
Association football defenders
Association football midfielders
Republic of Ireland association footballers
Republic of Ireland under-21 international footballers
Republic of Ireland youth international footballers
Dublin City F.C. players
League of Ireland players
West Ham United F.C. players
Bristol Rovers F.C. players
Premier League players
English Football League players
Slough Town F.C. players
Hemel Hempstead Town F.C. players
Chesham United F.C. players
Republic of Ireland expatriate association footballers